Piang Tan (1846–1933) a Chinese Maguindanaon ruler, popularly known as Datu Piang, is often referred to as the Grand Old Man of Cotabato.

Born of a Chinese merchant named Tuya Tan  (陳名頓) from Amoy, China and a Maguindanaon woman named Tiko, he was Datu Utto's Minister of Lands and became the wealthiest and the most prominent datu during the American era. He was a Chinese mestizo due to his Maguindanao and Chinese mixture. Datu Piang (sometimes referred to as Amai Mingka) was recognised as the undisputed Moro leader in Central Mindanao when the United States Army occupied and administered what was then referred to as "Moroland".

Datu Piang's son by his sixth wife, Polindao, was Datu Gumbay Piang, who led the Moro-Bolo Battalion to fight against the Japanese during their occupation of Mindanao in World War II.

See also
American Occupation of the Philippines
Insular Government
United States military government of the Philippine Islands

References
University of California Press. "Muslim Rulers and Rebels," (Accessed on February 25, 2010).  
"Datu Piang Book Reference," (Accessed on February 25, 2010).

1846 births
1933 deaths
Members of the Philippine Legislature
Filipino datus, rajas and sultans
Filipino Muslims
People from Cotabato City

Filipino politicians of Chinese descent